Yair Censor (Hebrew: יאיר צנזור, born November 29, 1943) is an Israeli mathematician and a professor at the University of Haifa, specializing in computational mathematics and optimization, as well as applications of these fields, in particular to medical imaging and radiation therapy treatment planning.

Biography
Yair Censor was born in Rishon LeZion. After serving in the IDF, he studied at the Technion in Haifa, where he earned his D.Sc. in 1975 under the supervision of Professor Adi Ben-Israel.

Academic career
Censor joined the department of mathematics at the University of Haifa in 1979, and became full professor in 1989. His research focuses on mathematical aspects of Intensity-Modulated Radiation Therapy (IMRT). In 2002, he founded the Center for Computational Mathematics and Scientific Computation at the University of Haifa. In recent years he is involved with research about the Superiorization Methodology.

Together with S.A. Zenios, he co-authored the book Parallel Optimization: Theory, Algorithms, and Applications (Oxford University Press, New York, NY, USA, 1997), for which he received the 1999 ICS (INFORMS Computing Society) Prize for Research Excellence in the Interface Between Operations Research and Computer Science.

Active in the struggle to preserve the academic freedom of the research universities in Israel, Censor was one of the founders of the Inter-Senate Committee (ISC) of the Universities for the Protection of Academic Independence.

See also
Education in Israel

References

External links
 Yair Censor website
 Convergence and Perturbation Resilience of Dynamic String-Averaging Projection Methods
 An iterative approach to plan combination in radiotherapy

1943 births
Academic staff of the University of Haifa
Israeli mathematicians
Living people